Stachytarpheta is a plant genus in the verbena family (Verbenaceae). The flowers are rich in nectar and popular with many butterflies, such as the South Asian crimson rose (Atrophaneura hector), Malabar banded swallowtail (Papilio liomedon), and grass yellow (Eurema hecabe) Hummingbirds, especially small species like Lophornis coquettes, Chlorostilbon emeralds, and Discosura thorntails, are especially attracted for nectar. Several species in this genus are known as porterweeds.

Species
Species include:

Stachytarpheta × abortiva Danser
Stachytarpheta acuminata DC. ex Schauer
Stachytarpheta × adulterina Urb. & Ekman
Stachytarpheta ajugifolia Schauer
Stachytarpheta alata (Moldenke) S.Atkins
Stachytarpheta albiflora DC. ex Schauer
Stachytarpheta almasensis Mansf.
Stachytarpheta amplexicaulis Moldenke
Stachytarpheta andersonii Moldenke
Stachytarpheta angolensis Moldenke
Stachytarpheta arenaria S.Atkins
Stachytarpheta atriflora S.Atkins
Stachytarpheta bicolor Hook.f.
Stachytarpheta boldinghii Moldenke
Stachytarpheta brasiliensis Moldenke
Stachytarpheta bromleyana S.Atkins
Stachytarpheta caatingensis S.Atkins
Stachytarpheta cajamarcensis Moldenke
Stachytarpheta calderonii Moldenke
Stachytarpheta candida Moldenke
Stachytarpheta canescens Kunth
Stachytarpheta cassiae S.Atkins
Stachytarpheta cayennensis (Rich.) Vahl
Stachytarpheta cearensis Moldenke
Stachytarpheta coccinea Schauer
Stachytarpheta commutata Schauer
Stachytarpheta confertifolia Moldenke
Stachytarpheta crassifolia Schrad.
Stachytarpheta dawsonii Moldenke
Stachytarpheta × debilis Danser
Stachytarpheta diamantinensis Moldenke
Stachytarpheta discolor Cham.
Stachytarpheta elegans Welw.
Stachytarpheta fallax A.E.Gonç.
Stachytarpheta frantzii Pol.
Stachytarpheta friedrichsthalii Hayek
Stachytarpheta froesii Moldenke
Stachytarpheta fruticosa (Millsp.) B.L.Rob.
Stachytarpheta galactea S.Atkins
Stachytarpheta ganevii S.Atkins
Stachytarpheta gesnerioides Cham.
Stachytarpheta glabra Cham.
Stachytarpheta glandulosa S.Atkins
Stachytarpheta glauca (Pohl) Walp.
Stachytarpheta glazioviana S.Atkins
Stachytarpheta × gracilis Danser
Stachytarpheta grisea Moldenke
Stachytarpheta guedesii S.Atkins
Stachytarpheta harleyi S.Atkins
Stachytarpheta hassleri Briq.
Stachytarpheta hatschbachii Moldenke
Stachytarpheta hintonii Moldenke
Stachytarpheta hirsutissima Link
Stachytarpheta hispida Nees & Mart.
Stachytarpheta × hybrida Moldenke
Stachytarpheta indica (L.) Vahl
Stachytarpheta integrifolia (Pohl) Walp.
Stachytarpheta × intercedens Danser
Stachytarpheta itambensis S.Atkins
Stachytarpheta jamaicensis (L.) Vahl
Stachytarpheta kingii Moldenke
Stachytarpheta lactea Schauer
Stachytarpheta lacunosa Mart. ex Schauer
Stachytarpheta laevis Moldenke
Stachytarpheta lanata Schauer
Stachytarpheta linearis Moldenke
Stachytarpheta longiflora Turcz.
Stachytarpheta longispicata (Pohl) S.Atkins
Stachytarpheta lopez-palacii Moldenke
Stachytarpheta luisana (Standl.) Standl.
Stachytarpheta lundellae Moldenke
Stachytarpheta lychnitis Mart. ex Schauer
Stachytarpheta lythrophylla Schauer
Stachytarpheta macedoi Moldenke
Stachytarpheta marginata Vahl
Stachytarpheta martiana Schauer
Stachytarpheta matogrossensis Moldenke
Stachytarpheta maximiliani Schauer
Stachytarpheta mexiae Moldenke
Stachytarpheta microphylla Walp.
Stachytarpheta miniacea Moldenke
Stachytarpheta monachinoi Moldenke
Stachytarpheta mutabilis (Jacq.) Vahl
Stachytarpheta orubica (L.) Vahl
Stachytarpheta pachystachya Mart. ex Schauer
Stachytarpheta paraguariensis Moldenke
Stachytarpheta peruviana Moldenke
Stachytarpheta petenensis Moldenke
Stachytarpheta piranii S.Atkins
Stachytarpheta pohliana Cham.
Stachytarpheta polyura Schauer
Stachytarpheta procumbens Moldenke
Stachytarpheta puberula (Moldenke) S.Atkins
Stachytarpheta pycnodonta Urb.
Stachytarpheta quadrangula Nees & Mart.
Stachytarpheta quirosana Moldenke
Stachytarpheta radlkoferiana Mansf.
Stachytarpheta restingensis Moldenke
Stachytarpheta reticulata Mart. ex Schauer
Stachytarpheta rhomboidalis (Pohl) Walp.
Stachytarpheta rivularis Moldenke
Stachytarpheta robinsoniana Moldenke
Stachytarpheta rupestris S.Atkins
Stachytarpheta scaberrima Cham.
Stachytarpheta schottiana Schauer
Stachytarpheta sellowiana Schauer
Stachytarpheta sericea S.Atkins
Stachytarpheta sessilis Moldenke
Stachytarpheta simplex Hayek
Stachytarpheta spathulata Moldenke
Stachytarpheta speciosa Pohl ex Schauer
Stachytarpheta sprucei Moldenke
Stachytarpheta stannardii S.Atkins
Stachytarpheta steyermarkii Moldenke
Stachytarpheta straminea Moldenke
Stachytarpheta strigosa Vahl
Stachytarpheta subincisa Turcz.
Stachytarpheta svensonii Moldenke
Stachytarpheta tabascana Moldenke
Stachytarpheta trimeni Rech.
Stachytarpheta × trimenii Rech.
Stachytarpheta trinitensis Moldenke
Stachytarpheta trispicata Nees & Mart.
Stachytarpheta tuberculata S.Atkins
Stachytarpheta urticifolia (Salisb.) Sims
Stachytarpheta velutina Moldenke
Stachytarpheta villosa (Pohl) Cham.
Stachytarpheta violacea Miranda
Stachytarpheta viscidula Schauer
Stachytarpheta weberbaueri Moldenke

Gallery

References

External links

Stachytarpheta indica - Mangrove.my

 
Verbenaceae genera
Taxa named by Martin Vahl
Taxonomy articles created by Polbot